Alex Connell (13 February 1930 – 26 November 2009) was a British speed skater. He competed in three events at the 1956 Winter Olympics.

References

1930 births
2009 deaths
British male speed skaters
Olympic speed skaters of Great Britain
Speed skaters at the 1956 Winter Olympics
People from Tarbolton